Earl Edwin Turner (May 6, 1923 – October 20, 1999) was an American professional baseball player. Turner was a backup catcher in Major League Baseball who played in 42 total games for the Pittsburgh Pirates during the 1948 and 1950 seasons. He served in the United States Army during World War II.

In a two-season MLB career, Turner was a .240 hitter (18 hits in 75 at bats) with three home runs and five RBI. His three homers, all solo shots, were hit in 1950 off Ralph Branca (June 24), Bobby Hogue (July 16, in a game in which Turner went 3-for-4), and Johnny Sain (July 17, his next-to-last Major League game).

Turner retired from pro ball after the 1952 minor league season and died in Lee, Massachusetts, at the age of 76.

References

External links
Baseball Reference
Retrosheet

1923 births
1999 deaths
Albany Senators players
Baseball players from Massachusetts
Evansville Braves players
Indianapolis Indians players
Jacksonville Tars players
Major League Baseball catchers
New Orleans Pelicans (baseball) players
Sportspeople from Pittsfield, Massachusetts
Pittsburgh Pirates players
United States Army personnel of World War II